Atiku is a given name and surname. It may refer to:

Given name
Atiku Abubakar (born 1946), Nigerian politician and businessman, Vice President of Nigeria from 1999 to 2007
Atikur Rahman Mallik, Bangladeshi film editor

Middle name
Abubakar Atiku Bagudu (born 1961), Nigerian politician and governor of Kebbi State, Nigeria

Surname
Abdur Rahman Atiku, Sultan of Sokoto from 1891 to 1902
Abu Bakr Atiku (1782–1842), third Sultan of the Sokoto Caliphate, from October 1837 until November 1842
Ahmadu Atiku (c. 1807-1866), also known as Ahmadu Zarruku, Sultan of Sokoto from 1859 to 1866
Amina Titi Atiku-Abubakar, Nigerian politician and activist, one of the wives of Atiku Abubakr, a former vice president of the Federal Republic of Nigeria
Jelili Atiku, Nigerian multimedia performance artist and sculptor